CMSA may refer to:

 Chain Makers' and Strikers' Association, a former British trade union
 Chicago Math and Science Academy
 China Manned Space Agency, the human spaceflight agency of China
 China Maritime Safety Administration
 Classical Mandolin Society of America
 Colleges of Medicine of South Africa
 Combinatorial Mathematics Society of Australasia
 Commercial Mortgage Securities Association
 Congressional Muslim Staffer Association
 Consolidated Metropolitan Statistical Area

See also 
 Case management (disambiguation)